Rory C. "Busta" Anderson II (born October 2, 1992) is a former American football tight end. He was drafted by the San Francisco 49ers in the seventh round of the 2015 NFL Draft. He played college football at South Carolina. He has also been a member of the Chicago Bears, Buffalo Bills, and Birmingham Iron.

High school
Played both football and basketball in high school at Powder Springs (GA) McEachern. As a junior, he helped the basketball team to the state AAAAA quarterfinals. As a senior, he was captain of the basketball team on the court, and caught 38 passes with 6 touchdowns on the football field.

Football recruiting websites labeled Rory as a high-end valuable 3 star recruit. Rory held over a dozen offers from colleges and ultimately chose South Carolina over schools such as Tennessee, Virginia, West Virginia, Illinois, Louisville, Mississippi State, USF, NC State, Cincinnati, and many others.

College
Anderson played college football at South Carolina from 2011 through the 2014 season. Although sidelined by injuries during his college career, he finished with 954 yards on 61 catches (15.6 average) and 9 touchdown catches.

Professional career

San Francisco 49ers
Anderson was drafted with the 37th pick in the 7th round (254th overall) by the San Francisco 49ers of the National Football League (NFL). The 49ers also drafted his college teammate Mike Davis in the 4th round. Along with Davis, the 49ers also signed college teammate quarterback Dylan Thompson as an undrafted rookie and wide receiver Bruce Ellington was drafted in the 4th round in the 2014 NFL Draft. All 4 of these players played together in the 2012-2013 season. On May 11, 2015, Anderson signed his rookie contract. Anderson caught his first touchdown in a preseason game against the San Diego Chargers on September 3, 2015. On August 28, 2016, the 49ers released Anderson along with offensive lineman Erik Pears.

Chicago Bears
On September 27, 2016, the Chicago Bears signed Anderson to the practice squad. He was placed on the practice squad/injured list on October 10, 2016.

Buffalo Bills
On August 20, 2017, Anderson was signed by the Buffalo Bills. He was waived on September 2, 2017.

Birmingham Iron
In 2019, Anderson joined the Birmingham Iron of the Alliance of American Football. He was placed on injured reserve on March 4, 2019, and waived from injured reserve on April 1, 2019.

Personal life
Anderson has stated that the reason the nickname "Busta" became so prevalent in his life is because his mom, Rhonda Anderson called him "Buster" at a very young age.

References

External links
South Carolina Gamecocks bio
South Carolina Gamecocks highlights

1992 births
Living people
American football tight ends
Birmingham Iron players
Buffalo Bills players
Chicago Bears players
People from Powder Springs, Georgia
Players of American football from Georgia (U.S. state)
San Francisco 49ers players
South Carolina Gamecocks football players
Sportspeople from Cobb County, Georgia